Tomislav Ivičić (born 27 October 1987) is a Croatian footballer who plays for Izola.

Club career
Born in Pakrac, SR Croatia, he played with NK Bjelovar, NK Križevci, HNK Šibenik, NK Međimurje and NK Pomorac Kostrena between 2006 and 2011.  In summer 2011 he joined NK Karlovac and played in the 2011–12 Croatian First League.  During 2012 he played with NK Vinogradar and NK Samobor.  In the second half of the 2012–13 season he played with NK GOŠK Gabela in the Bosnian Premier League, and in the season 2013–14 he played in Al-Fahaheel FC in the Kuwaiti Premier League.  Then he was back to Croatia and played the first half of the 2014–15 season with NK Rudeš in the Croatian Second League.  In January 2015 he was abroad again, this time signing with Serbian SuperLiga side FK Napredak Kruševac.

In summer 2017 he joined NK Zadar. On 31 January 2019, Ivičić joined German club BSV Schwarz-Weiß Rehden on a contract until June 2020.

References

External links
 
 

1987 births
Living people
People from Pakrac
Association football forwards
Croatian footballers
NK Bjelovar players
NK Križevci players
HNK Šibenik players
NK Međimurje players
NK Pomorac 1921 players
NK Karlovac players
NK Vinogradar players
NK Samobor players
NK GOŠK Gabela players
Al-Fahaheel FC players
NK Rudeš players
FK Napredak Kruševac players
HNK Segesta players
NK Dugopolje players
NK Zadar players
NK Vitez players
BSV Schwarz-Weiß Rehden players
FC Rot-Weiß Koblenz players
NK Opatija players
Croatian Football League players
Kuwait Premier League players
First Football League (Croatia) players
Serbian SuperLiga players
Premier League of Bosnia and Herzegovina players
Regionalliga players
Croatian expatriate footballers
Expatriate footballers in Bosnia and Herzegovina
Croatian expatriate sportspeople in Bosnia and Herzegovina
Expatriate footballers in Kuwait
Croatian expatriate sportspeople in Kuwait
Expatriate footballers in Serbia
Croatian expatriate sportspeople in Serbia
Expatriate footballers in Germany
Croatian expatriate sportspeople in Germany